Gwangju FC (Korean: 광주 FC) is a South Korean professional football club based in Gwangju that competes in the K League 1, the top tier of South Korean football. They joined the K League in the 2011 season.

History
Gwangju FC was founded in December 2010 and first participated in the K League in 2011. In 2012, Gwangju FC was relegated to the K League Challenge, the newly-formed second-tier professional league in South Korea. In 2014, they were promoted back to the top tier for the 2015 season.

Players

Current squad

Out on loan

Coaching staff 
Manager:  Lee Jung-hyo
Assistant manager:  Lee Jeong-kyu
First team coach:  Cho Yong-tae
Goalkeeping coach:  Shin Jeong-hwan
Physio:  Kim Kyung-do

Managers

Honours

League 
 K League 2
Winners (2): 2019, 2022
 Runners-up (1): 2014

Season-by-season records

Key
QF = Quarter-final
Ro16 = Round of 16
Ro32 = Round of 32
3R = Third round

References

External links

 Official website 

 
Association football clubs established in 2010
K League 1 clubs
Sport in Gwangju
2010 establishments in South Korea
K League 2 clubs